Irene Martínez Gamba (born 1957) is an Argentine–American mathematician. She works as a professor of mathematics at the University of Texas at Austin, where she holds the W.A. Tex Moncrief, Jr. Chair in Computational Engineering and Sciences and is head of the Applied Mathematics Group in the Institute for Computational Engineering and Sciences.

Education and career
Gamba graduated from the University of Buenos Aires in 1981. She went to the University of Chicago for her graduate studies, earning a master's degree in 1985 and a Ph.D. in 1989, under the supervision of Jim Douglas, Jr.

After postdoctoral studies at Purdue University and the Courant Institute of Mathematical Sciences of New York University, she became an Assistant Professor at NYU in 1994 and Associate Professor in 1996. She became a Professor at the University of Texas at Austin in 1997. At the University of Texas, she was the Joe B. and Louise Cook Professor from 2007 to 2013, the John T. Stuart III Centennial Professor from 2013 to 2014, and the W.A. Tex Moncreif, Jr. Chair in Computational Sciences and Engineering III since 2014.

Recognition
In 2012, Gamba became a fellow of the Society for Industrial and Applied Mathematics, and one of the inaugural fellows of the American Mathematical Society. The Association for Women in Mathematics selected her as their 2014 Sonia Kovalevsky Lecturer.

References

External links
Home page

1957 births
Living people
20th-century American mathematicians
21st-century American mathematicians
Argentine mathematicians
Argentine women mathematicians
American women mathematicians
University of Buenos Aires alumni
University of Chicago alumni
New York University faculty
University of Texas at Austin faculty
Fellows of the American Mathematical Society
Fellows of the Society for Industrial and Applied Mathematics
20th-century women mathematicians
21st-century women mathematicians
20th-century American women
21st-century American women